Sergio Marclay (born January 29, 1982 in Quilmes, Argentina) is an Argentine association football Forward currently playing for Argentino de Quilmes of the Primera C in Argentina.

Teams
  Quilmes 1998-2004
  Atlético Rafaela 2004-2005
  Everton 2005-2006
  Atlético Rafaela 2006-2007
  Quilmes 2007-2009
  Atlético Rafaela 2009-2010
  Gimnasia de Jujuy 2010–2011
  Temperley 2011–2012
  Gimnasia y Esgrima 2012-2014
  Argentino de Quilmes 2014-

References
 

1982 births
Living people
Argentine footballers
Argentine expatriate footballers
Quilmes Atlético Club footballers
Atlético de Rafaela footballers
Gimnasia y Esgrima de Jujuy footballers
Everton de Viña del Mar footballers
Expatriate footballers in Chile
Association football forwards
People from Quilmes
Sportspeople from Buenos Aires Province